Ahmed Olotu (born 9 December 1950) popularly known as Mzee Chillo is a Tanzanian veteran actor.  He has starred in over 100 movies in his film career. He has been featured in both regional and international films making him among the greatest Tanzanian actors of all time. He has starred in movies with big names on the African film industry including Steven Kanumba, African stars Nkiru Sylvanus, Emmanuel France and Mercy Johnson.

Early life
Olotu attended his elementary school at Majengo Primary school in Kilimanjaro, Moshi, Tanzania from early 1957 to late 1964. He then joined Azania High school in Dar es Salaam to pursue his secondary education from 1966 to 1969. In 1970 he attended an administrative course at the Civil service center in Dar es Salaam. After completing this course, he started working for the ministry of agriculture as a junior administrator in mid-1971. He also worked at Bora Shoes Company for a couple of years. He later traveled to Saudi Arabia to acquire Islamic knowledge at the Islamic university.
When he came back from Saudi Arabia, he became a high school teacher and taught in a couple of schools in Moshi, Tanzania, Tanzania. The schools include Weru Weru girl's high school, Kibosho girls high school, Old Moshi secondary school, and Majengo secondary school.

Personal life

Olotu is married with one child named Fatuma Ahmed Olotu. He currently lives with his family in Dar es Salaam, Tanzania.

Films movies

Although Ahmed has been acting since elementary school and did a couple of theatre performances, he had his first film feature in 2003 titled Sumu ya Mapenzi then later on in the same year did Tanzia both done in Swahili. Since then, he has been featured in hundreds of films and has exceptionally done well and earned himself a great name and respect in the East and Central Africa region.
He has been featured in movies with big African acts. This includes Mercy Johnson, Emmanuel France, and Nkiru Sylvanus in Cross my sin movie and The director

Filmography

International appearances and features
Going Bongo – USA
Cross my sin

Films

Mapacha
Deviation of marriage
Miss bongo
Fake pastors
The same script
Village pastor
Heroes of the church
Tears on Valentine's Day
Blood test
Ray of hope
Lost
Crush
Simu ya kifo
Pay Back
Black Sunday
Happy couples
Usaliti
Anti virus
Lost twins
Mfu Hai
Pamoja
Ndani ya matatizo
Tax Driver
Last Card
Hot Friday
Crash
Branch of love
Msimamo wangu
Campus
Trials
Jezebele
Mtandao
Myororo
Cut-off
Hard times
Rafiki hatari
Desperado
Mpishi
College of music
Sobbing sound
Second wife
Two days condition
Cleopatra
Kovu la Laana
Sekunde chache
Identical
Lost dream
Jamal
Sweet and sour
Maskini mwanangu
Pooja
Tears of a killer
Siri ya mojo
Dent mapepe
Je umefunga mlango?
Deni la haki
Queen spear
Mwaka wa shetani
No more secrets
Kovu la laana
Jeraha la ndoa
Oysterbay
World of benefits
Graduation day
Sakata la penzi
Too late
My book 
Vagabond
Pigo
Greener
Silent killer
Dangerous girl
11 September
Kalunde
Bintinusa
Misukosuko
Yellow banana
Shakira
The Big Mistake
Love clinic
3 names
Ndani ya gunia
Royal family
Family poison
Viola
Fair game
More than a liar
Kisasi cha subiani
Coppy
I cant forget
Where God is
Machozi yangu
The black Ghost
Nyabo
Hisia zangu
Swadakta
Utata
Pretty teacher
Albino
Fingo
Kaburi la mapenzi
Trip to America
Upande wa pili wa ndoa
Script writer
Love is war
Sim card
Mkataba
Olopong
The Golden Magic

Series

Jumba la thahabu (aired on Tanzania Broadcasting Corporation)
Unfaithful (aired on Africa Magic(M-Net))
Indecency (airs on Tanzania Broadcasting Corporation)
Awakening (aired on Africa Magic (M-Net))
Martin (airs on Africa Magic(M-Net))
Jasmine

Other endeavours

Due to the popularity in the society, companies have featured Ahmed in numerous television and radio commercials. He has also featured in a couple of government and Non-governmental organisations in documentaries and campaigns.

Awards

Dogo dogo movie – UNICEF
Ray of Hope- Zanzibar International Film Festival 2011
Ray of Hope- 2013 Africa Magic Viewers Choice Awards 
Huba- Zanzibar International Film Festival 2010

References

Tanzanian male film actors
1950 births
Living people